Augusta is a village in Kalamazoo County in the U.S. state of Michigan. The population was 885 at the 2010 census. The village is mostly within Ross Township, though a small portion extends south into Charleston Township.

Fort Custer Recreation Area is immediately south of the village on the east side of the Kalamazoo River.

Augusta was established in 1832.

Geography

Demographics

2010 census
As of the 2010 census, there were 885 people, 362 households, and 223 families living in the village. The racial makeup of the village was 94.0% White, 1.5% African American, 1.4% Native American, 0.1% Asian, 1.0% from other races, and 2.0% from two or more races. Hispanic or Latino of any race were 2.4% of the population.

There were 362 households, of which 31.8% had children under the age of 18 living with them, 41.2% were married couples living together, 13.8% had a female householder with no husband present, 6.6% had a male householder with no wife present, and 38.4% were non-families. 29.8% of all households were made up of individuals, and 8% had someone living alone who was 65 years of age or older. The average household size was 2.44 and the average family size was 3.02.

The median age in the village was 39.2 years. 24.2% of residents were under the age of 18; 9.9% were between the ages of 18 and 24; 24.4% were from 25 to 44; 30.6% were from 45 to 64; and 11% were 65 years of age or older. The gender makeup of the village was 49.8% male and 50.2% female.

2000 census
As of the 2000 census, there were 899 people, 368 households, and 238 families living in the village. The racial makeup of the village was 95.77% White, 0.67% African American, 1.11% Native American, 0.22% Asian, 0.33% from other races, and 1.89% from two or more races. Hispanic or Latino of any race were 1.33% of the population.

There were 368 households, out of which 34.8% had children under the age of 18 living with them, 50.5% were married couples living together, 11.4% had a female householder with no husband present, and 35.3% were non-families. 28.5% of all households were made up of individuals, and 8.4% had someone living alone who was 65 years of age or older. The average household size was 2.44 and the average family size was 3.03.

In the village, the population was spread out, with 27.0% under the age of 18, 6.5% from 18 to 24, 36.8% from 25 to 44, 19.0% from 45 to 64, and 10.7% who were 65 years of age or older. The median age was 36 years. For every 100 females, there were 99.3 males. For every 100 females age 18 and over, there were 89.6 males.

The median income for a household in the village was $44,375, and the median income for a family was $52,250. Males had a median income of $36,087 versus $30,625 for females. The per capita income for the village was $19,207. About 6.0% of families and 4.8% of the population were below the poverty line, including 4.2% of those under age 18 and 6.5% of those age 65 or over.

Schools
In 1951, members of the community, along with those from neighboring Galesburg, formed a joint public school district. Today, Galesburg-Augusta Community Schools consists of a primary school and a high school in Galesburg and a middle school in Augusta.

Points of interest
 The Fort Custer Recreation Area is immediately south of the village on the east side of the Kalamazoo River.
 The Barn Theatre is Michigan's oldest professional equity summer stock theatre.
 Sherman Lake YMCA Outdoor is an outdoor youth education center.

Notable people

 Jean Engstrom, actress of 1950s films and television
 Wayne Lamb, dancer and choreographer, director for the Barn Theatre

References

Notes

Sources

External links
 Kalamazoo County Chamber of Commerce
 The Barn Theatre, equity summer stock theatre
 Fort Custer Recreation Area
 Augusta Depot, stop for the Michigan Central Railway
 Gull Lake View, Golf Country Club & Resort
 Yarrow Golf Golf & Conference Center
 The Olde World Village Outdoor entertainment venue

Villages in Kalamazoo County, Michigan
Villages in Michigan
Kalamazoo–Portage metropolitan area
Populated places established in 1832
1832 establishments in Michigan Territory